Hugh Rawlinson is an Australian rowing coxswain. He coxed Western Australian eights competing at Australia's King's Cup and was a medallist at senior World Championships.

State and club rowing
He first made state selection for Western Australia in the 2006 senior eight contesting the King's Cup at the Interstate Regatta within the Australian Rowing Championships. He steered three consecutive King's Cup races for New South Wales from 2006 to 2009.

International representative rowing
Rawlinson made his Australian representative debut in 2008 at the World Championships which being an Olympic year contested only lightweight and non- Olympic heavyweight events. Rawlinson steered an Australian coxed pair at Linz 2008 to a bronze medal rowed by Nick Baxter and  Fergus Pragnell. The pair through came from a long way back in the field. They were in 5th position after the first quarter of the race and could not improve on this over the next 1000 metres. Heading into the final stages of the race Pragnell and Baxter kicked and passed the Italian and Polish crews. Poland had been leading the whole race but fatigued badly to finish 5th. Australia could not catch Canada or France and finished in a time of 7:09.30, roughly a boat and a half behind gold medallists France.

References 

 

Living people
Australian male rowers
World Rowing Championships medalists for Australia
Coxswains (rowing)
Year of birth missing (living people)